Sodium permanganate is the inorganic compound with the formula NaMnO4. It is closely related to the more commonly encountered potassium permanganate, but it is generally less desirable, because it is more expensive to produce.  It is mainly available as the monohydrate.  This salt absorbs water from the atmosphere and has a low melting point.  Being about 15 times more soluble than KMnO4, sodium permanganate finds some applications where very high concentrations of MnO4− are sought.

Preparation and properties

Sodium permanganate cannot be prepared analogously to the route to KMnO4 because the required intermediate manganate salt, Na2MnO4, does not form.  Thus less direct routes are used including conversion from KMnO4.

Sodium permanganate behaves similarly to potassium permanganate.  It dissolves readily in water to give deep purple solutions, evaporation of which gives prismatic purple-black glistening crystals of the monohydrate NaMnO4·H2O.  The potassium salt does not form a hydrate. Because of its hygroscopic nature, it is less useful in analytical chemistry than its potassium counterpart.

It can be prepared by the reaction of manganese dioxide with sodium hypochlorite:

 2 MnO2 + 3 NaClO + 2 NaOH → 2 NaMnO4 + 3 NaCl + H2O

Applications
Because of its high solubility, its aqueous solutions are used as etchants in printed circuitry. It is gaining popularity in water treatment for taste, odor, and zebra mussel
control. The V-2 rocket used it in combination with hydrogen peroxide to drive a steam turbopump.

References

Sodium compounds
Permanganates
Oxidizing agents
Disinfectants